Agrypnia is a genus of giant caddisflies in the family Phryganeidae. There are about 19 described species in Agrypnia.

The type species for Agrypnia is Agrypnia pagetana J. Curtis.

Species
These 19 species belong to the genus Agrypnia:

 Agrypnia acristata Wiggins, 1998 i c g
 Agrypnia colorata (Hagen, 1873) i c g
 Agrypnia czerskyi (Martynov, 1924) i c g
 Agrypnia deflata (Milne, 1931) i c g
 Agrypnia glacialis Hagen, 1873 i c g b
 Agrypnia improba (Hagen, 1873) i c g
 Agrypnia incurvata Wiggins, 1998 i c g
 Agrypnia legendrei (Navas, 1923) i c g
 Agrypnia macdunnoughi (Milne, 1931) i c g b
 Agrypnia obsoleta (Hagen, 1864) i c g
 Agrypnia pagetana Curtis, 1835 i c g
 Agrypnia picta Kolenati, 1848 i c g
 Agrypnia principalis (Martynov, 1909) g
 Agrypnia sahlbergi (McLachlan, 1880) i c g
 Agrypnia sordida (McLachlan, 1871) i c g
 Agrypnia straminea Hagen, 1873 i c g
 Agrypnia ulmeri (Martynov, 1909) i c g
 Agrypnia varia (Fabricius, 1793) i c g
 Agrypnia vestita (Walker, 1852) i c g b

Data sources: i = ITIS, c = Catalogue of Life, g = GBIF, b = Bugguide.net

References

Further reading

External links

 

Trichoptera genera
Articles created by Qbugbot